Bossiaea ornata, commonly known as broad leaved brown pea, is a species of flowering plant in the family Fabaceae and is endemic to the south-west of Western Australia. It is a shrub with variably-shaped leaves, typically egg-shaped or oblong, and yellow or orange-yellow and reddish-brown flowers.

Description
Flowering occurs from July to November.

Taxonomy and naming
Broad leaved brown pea was first formally described in 1835 by John Lindley who gave it the name Lalage ornata in Edwards's Botanical Register from specimens grown in the "Mr Knight's Nursery" from seed collected by William Baxter. In 1864, George Bentham changed the name to Bossiaea ornata in Flora Australiensis. The specific epithet (ornata) means "handsome" or "showy".

Distribution and habitat
This bossiaea is found between the Avon Valley National Park and south to Augusta, Western Australia, then east to Albany in the Esperance Plains, Jarrah Forest, Swan Coastal Plain and Warren biogeographic regions, growing in the understorey of forest and woodland.

Conservation status
Bossiaea ornata is classified as "not threatened" by the Western Australian Government Department of Parks and Wildlife.

References

ornata
Flora of Western Australia
Taxa named by John Lindley
Plants described in 1835